Eclose is a former commune in the Isère department in southeastern France. In January 2015 it merged with Badinières, forming the new commune Eclose-Badinières.

Population

See also
Communes of the Isère department

References

Former communes of Isère
Isère communes articles needing translation from French Wikipedia